Christoffel 'Christo' Ferreira  (born 28 August 1960) is a former South African rugby union player.

Playing career

Ferreira played for Free State and Northern Transvaal in the South African provincial competitions and also for the Springboks. He made his test debut against the visiting New Zealand Cavaliers on 10 May 1986 at Newlands in Cape Town. He played in the first two tests against the Cavaliers and was then replaced by Garth Wright for the last two tests.

Test history

See also
List of South Africa national rugby union players – Springbok no. 543

References

1960 births
Living people
Blue Bulls players
Free State Cheetahs players
Rugby union players from Welkom
South Africa international rugby union players
South African rugby union players
Rugby union scrum-halves